This list contains media that discuss vegan messages and ideas. They generally involve the discussion of the vegan philosophy and diet in relation to ethics, environmentalism, and nutrition.

Documentary films

Books

Magazines and online publications
Naked Food
 VegNews
 Vegetarian Times

Podcasts
 Food for Thought
 Main Street Vegan
 Nutrition Facts
 Our Hen House
 The ChickPeeps

YouTube channels

 That Vegan Teacher
 Beyond Carnism
 Acharya Prashant
 Joey Carbstrong

Cooking shows 

 Vegan MashUp, hosted by Toni Fiore
 Living on the Veg, hosted by BOSH! chefs Henry Firth and Ian Theasby

See also 
 List of fictional vegetarian characters
 List of songs about animal rights
 List of vegetarian and vegan companies
 History of veganism
 History of vegetarianism

References

Veganism
Mass media lists
Documentary films about environmental issues
Documentary films about agriculture
Documentary films about animal rights
Documentary films about vegetarianism
Ethics lists
Vegan media